Nyamwezi is a major Bantu language of central Tanzania. It forms a dialect continuum with Sukuma, but is more distinct from other neighboring languages.

Konongo and Ruwila are sometimes considered dialects.

Phonology

Consonants 

 Prenasalized voiceless stops [ᵐp ⁿt] may also frequently occur, as a result of loan words.
 Nasal sounds /m ŋ/ may also occur as labialized [mʷ ŋʷ].

Vowels

Tones 
Tones present in Nyamwezi are high /v́/, low /v̀/, and rising /v̌/.

Sample text

Banhu bose bubyalagwa biyagalulile, n'ikujo haki zilenganelile. Banhu bose bina masala na wiganiki, hu kuyomba ihayilwe bitogwe giti bana ba mbyazi bumo.

All human beings are born free and equal in dignity and rights. They are endowed with reason and conscience and should act towards one another in a spirit of brotherhood.

References

 
Northeast Bantu languages
Languages of Tanzania